Ellerslie AFC is an association football club based in Ellerslie, New Zealand. The senior team currently competes in the NRFL Championship.

Club history
Ellerslie AFC’s history goes back to the original founding of the Auckland Football Association in 1887, whereby it was one of the seven clubs to participate in the Association’s inaugural competition. The Club continued into the second season of organised soccer in Auckland, but, like the playing of the game at that time, did not continue past that point. Auckland football had slipped into a period of recess, due to the lack of suitable grounds, and Ellerslie became an early victim of the break in competition.

Come 1953 and the Club was reformed through the efforts of a number of families. Enough members were gathered to form two senior teams in that first season, with games played at the Michaels Avenue ground, while training sessions took place at Ellerslie Domain, courtesy of the local rugby league club’s generosity in lending the club the land for this purpose. Training sessions on a Thursday evening consisted of a full-scale match between the previous Saturday’s first team and reserves, an encounter from which the coming Saturday’s line-ups were selected by the coaches and the committee members. The club has been based at Michaels Ave ever since, which they share with Ellerslie Cricket Club.

Honours
Men's Premier Team League Honours:
 Northern Premier League – 1993
 Country Foods Cup – runner-up 1986

Women's Premier Team League Honours:
 Kate Sheppard Cup – winners 2001, runners-up 2002; 2003
 AWFA Knockout Shield – winners 1973, runners-up 1988; 1989

Recent League positions
2019 - Lotto NRFL Division 1 (10th)
2018 - Lotto NRFL Division 1 (7th)
2017 - Lotto NRFL Division 1 (10th)
2016 - Lotto NRFL Division 1 (6th)
2015 - Lotto NRFL Division 1 (4th)
2014 - Lotto NRFL Division 1 (5th)
2013 - Lotto NRFL Premier League (9th) - Relegated
2012 - Lotto NRFL Division 1 (2nd) - Promoted
2011 - Lotto NRFL Division 1 (4th)
2010 - Lotto NRFL Division 1 (1st)
2010 - Lotto NRFL Division 1B (4th)
2009 - Lotto NRFL Division 1 (6th)

Notable former players
The following former Ellerslie AFC players have represented New Zealand at senior international level.
  Michael Boxall
  Fred de Jong
  Dave Witteveen
  Michael Ridenton

References

External links
Ellerslie Website
Auckland Football Federation
New Zealand 2004/05 Season Results

Association football clubs in Auckland
1887 establishments in New Zealand